Veterinary pathologists are veterinarians who specialize in the diagnosis of diseases through the examination of animal tissue and body fluids. Like medical pathology, veterinary pathology is divided into two branches, anatomical pathology and clinical pathology. Other than the diagnosis of disease in food-producing animals, companion animals, zoo animals and wildlife, veterinary pathologists also have an important role in drug discovery and safety as well as scientific research.

Veterinary anatomical pathology
Anatomical pathology (Commonwealth) or Anatomic pathology (U.S.) is concerned with the diagnosis of disease based on the gross examination, microscopic, and molecular examination of organs, tissues, and whole bodies (necropsy). The Indian, European, Japanese and American Colleges of Veterinary Pathologists certify veterinary pathologists through a certifying exam. The American College of Veterinary Pathologist certification exam consists of four parts - gross pathology, microscopic pathology, veterinary pathology, and general pathology. Only the general pathology section is shared between the anatomic and clinical pathology examinations. Anatomic pathologists are employed in a number of different positions, including diagnostics, teaching, research, and the pharmaceutical industry.

Veterinary clinical pathology
Clinical pathology is concerned with the diagnosis of disease based on the laboratory analysis of bodily fluids such as blood, urine or cavitary effusions, or tissue aspirates using the tools of chemistry, microbiology, hematology and molecular pathology. The Indian, European, Japanese and American Colleges of Veterinary Pathologists certify veterinary clinical pathologists. The American College of Veterinary Pathologists certification exam consists of four parts: General Pathology (shared with the Anatomic Pathology certifying examination), Cytology and Surgical Pathology, Hematology, and Clinical Chemistry. The credential, DACVP (Diplomate, American College of Veterinary Pathologists)  is usually followed by a parenthetical notation of "(Clinical Pathology)" to distinguish DACVP counterparts certified for anatomic pathology. The European credential is DipECVCP (Diplomate of the European College of Veterinary Clinical Pathology). Clinical pathologists are employed in diagnostic pathology, veterinary and medical teaching, research, and the pharmaceutical industry.

See also
 Veterinary medicine

References

External links
 American College of Veterinary Pathologists
 European College of Veterinary Clinical Pathology
 European College of Veterinary Pathologists

Veterinary medicine